Fuscopannaria obtegens is a species of corticolous (bark-dwelling), squamulose lichen in the family Pannariaceae. Found in China, it was formally described as a new species in 2007 by Norwegian lichenologist Per Magnus Jørgensen. It is only known to occur in the type locality. The squamules are imbricating, meaning they overlap each other; according to the author, they give the impression of a tiled roof reminiscent of stave churches in Norway.

References

obtegens
Lichens described in 2007
Taxa named by Per Magnus Jørgensen